Twin Arrows is a ghost town located in the central part of Arizona on U.S. Route 66 (US 66) in Coconino County between the city of Flagstaff and the town of Winslow.

Brief history
The area in which Twin Arrows is located was inhabited by the Hopi and Navajo tribes. The Navajo fought against the Apaches in the area. The first settlers to arrive in the area of European descent were the Spanish conquistadores. The area became part of Mexico when Mexico gained its independence from Spain.

The United States fought against Mexico in what is known as the Mexican–American War. The war ended officially when the 1848 Treaty of Guadalupe Hidalgo was signed and forced onto the remnant Mexican government. It specified its major consequence, the Mexican Cession of the northern territories of Alta California and Santa Fe de Nuevo México to the United States.

Wagon roads routes between Flagstaff and Winslow were surveyed in the 1880s. The Atlantic and Pacific Railroad choose to build the railroad along it. The railway passed to the north of the modern alignment of the National Old Trails which would eventually become US 66. The U.S. Highway System established US 66 in 1926. US 66 served as a major path for those who migrated west during the Dust Bowl of the 1930s. The road supported the economies of the communities through which it passed.

Traffic began to flow through the Twin Arrows area because Route 66 was aligned along the National Old Trails Road. A business named the Canyon Padre Trading Post, named for the gorge that cuts nearby, was established in the late 1940s in Twin Arrows. Business was slow for the store and diner until the owners changed its name to "Twin Arrows Trading Post", inspired by nearby town of Two Guns and added a service station. Two  giant arrows which were placed on the property were easily recognized by traveling motorist and the business began to fourish. In early 2022, one of the two arrows broke at the base, and is currently still on the ground next to its surviving partner.

Decline

The Twin Arrows Trading Post began to fail with the construction of the Interstate 40 (I-40), because motorists no longer had to take US 66. Business for the Twin Arrows Trading Post began to decline and it was not long before the store/diner/service station/gift shop passed through the hands of various owners. This continued until 1995, when it was finally closed and abandoned.  

The land where Twin Arrows is located is in the Navajo and Hopi reservations and owned by the Hopi tribe. In 2013, the Twin Arrows Navajo Gaming Casino opened to the north of the trading post site. The twin arrows sculpture, which is pictured,  is featured on the album art of the musical album "Man Mountain" by Blue States.

Images

See also

Gillett, Arizona

References

Further reading
 Ghost Towns and Historical Haunts in Arizona; Publisher: Golden West Publishers; .

External links
 Win Buttes – Ghost Town of the Month at azghosttowns.com

Buildings and structures in Navajo County, Arizona
History of Navajo County, Arizona
Ghost towns in Arizona